James Webster Wilhelm (born September 20, 1952) is an American former outfielder in Major League Baseball from  to  for the San Diego Padres.

Chosen in the seventh round of the 1974 Major League Baseball Draft, Wilhelm spent five seasons in the Padres' farm system before his recall in September 1978. In his first game on September 4, Wilhelm doubled off the Atlanta Braves' Larry McWilliams, driving in two baserunners and putting the Padres ahead to stay in a game they would eventually win 8–4.  Although he started the 1979 season in Triple-A, Wilhelm was recalled to San Diego in July and appeared in 39 games over the remainder of the season, batting .243 with 25 hits.

Rather than report to the Indians, Wilhelm, 27, retired from the game.

His final MLB totals included 49 games played, all with the Padres, with six doubles and three triples among his 32 MLB hits.

References

External links

1952 births
Living people
Major League Baseball outfielders
Baseball players from San Jose, California
San Diego Padres players
Alexandria Aces players
Hawaii Islanders players
Amarillo Gold Sox players
Walla Walla Padres players
Santa Clara Broncos baseball players
Sportspeople from San Rafael, California
Bellarmine College Preparatory alumni